Antal Vágó , Weiss (9 August 1891 – 30 December 1944) was a Hungarian international footballer who played as a midfielder. Vágó, who was Jewish, played club football for MTK, playing midfield for 12 seasons and winning the league nine time, and Fővárosi TC.  He also represented Hungarian national team at international level, earning 17 caps between 1908 and 1917. He also competed at the 1912 Summer Olympics.

He was shot dead into the Danube during the Arrow Cross rule.

References

Sources
 Antal Vágó Bio, Stats and Results
 Antal Zoltán – Hoffer József: Alberttől Zsákig, Budapest, Sportkiadó, 1968
 Rejtő László – Lukács László – Szepesi György: Felejthetetlen 90 percek, Budapest, Sportkiadó, 1977,

External links
Profile at Jewsinsports.org

1891 births
1944 deaths
Hungarian Jews
Jewish footballers
Hungarian footballers
Hungary international footballers
Olympic footballers of Hungary
Footballers at the 1912 Summer Olympics
MTK Budapest FC players
Hungarian expatriate footballers
Association football midfielders
People executed by the Government of National Unity (Hungary)
Jewish Hungarian sportspeople
People executed by Hungary by firing squad